Tutu Sohlberg (born 8 August 1941) is a Finnish equestrian. She competed in two events at the 1988 Summer Olympics.

References

1941 births
Living people
Finnish female equestrians
Finnish dressage riders
Olympic equestrians of Finland
Equestrians at the 1988 Summer Olympics
Sportspeople from Helsinki